Wilhelm Scheuchzer (1803–1866) was a Swiss painter.
His paintings have typical features of the romanticism movement, with extensively idealised views of the alpine landscape.
He was born in Hausen am Albis and died in Munich. From 1830 he worked in Munich, often painting for Maximilian II of Bavaria.

References

This article was initially translated from the German Wikipedia.

19th-century Swiss painters
Swiss male painters
1803 births
1866 deaths
19th-century Swiss male artists